Kwara South Senatorial District covers seven local government areas which include Ekiti, Oke-Oro, Offa, Ifelodun, Irepodun, Isin , and Oyun. The headquarters of Kwara South Senatorial District is Omu-Aran in Irepodun Local Government. Lola Ashiru of the All Progressives Congress, APC is the current representative of the Kwara South Senatorial District.

List of senators representing Kwara South

Notes

References 

Kwara State
Senatorial districts in Nigeria